Guy Williams (born 28 April 1984), is an Australian former professional rugby league footballer who last played for the Lézignan Sangliers in the Elite One Championship and previously the Brisbane Broncos in the NRL competition. He played as a utility back or in the second row.

Playing career
Williams made his first grade debut for Brisbane in Round 15 2009 against Cronulla which ended in a 46-12 loss.  Williams went on to play for the Central Comets in the Queensland Cup.

In 2011, Williams left Central Comets and moved to France where he captained Toulouse Olympique. In 2013 he returned to Central Comets now renamed Central Queensland Capras and went on to captain the side as well as play for them in over 150 games in his two spells.

Post playing
Williams previously worked at The Morning Bulletin in Rockhampton as a sports journalist.

Williams was appointed head coach of the Central Queensland Capras in 2021.

References

External links
Brisbane Broncos profile
Central Comets profile

1984 births
Living people
Australian journalists
Australian rugby league players
Brisbane Broncos players
Central Queensland Capras players
Rugby league centres
Rugby league five-eighths
Rugby league locks
Rugby league second-rows
Toulouse Olympique captains
Toulouse Olympique players
Place of birth missing (living people)